House Work may refer to:

Homemaking, management of a home
House Work (novel), a 1994 novel by Kristina McGrath
"House Work" (song), a 2016 song by Jax Jones